Lorissa McComas (November 26, 1970 – November 3, 2009) was an American actress and glamour model.

Early life
McComas graduated from Princeton High School in Sharonville, Ohio in 1988. She was an education major at Miami University before she started stripping and modeling.

Early career and acting
In 1990, McComas was arrested, along with another stripper, on charges of prostitution by Hamilton County, Ohio police. She had allowed a guest at a bachelor party to tuck a dollar bill into a garter just above her knee; this was treated as a form of prostitution under the very strict Cincinnati ordinances of that time.

By 1994, she was the owner of Extasy Entertainment, a company that provided strippers to clients in the Cincinnati area. Cincinnati had no strip bars during this time period.

Death
McComas died on November 3, 2009.

Filmography
Project Viper (2003)
Raptor (2001) - Lola Tanner, Sheriff Jim Tanner's daughter
The Bare Wench Project (2000) - Lori
Hot Boyz (1999) - Roxanne
Piranha (1995) remake of the 1978 film 
Stormswept (1995) - Kelly
Lap Dancing (1995) - Angie Parker

References

External links 
 
 
 

1970 births
2009 deaths
American female adult models
Glamour models
Actresses from Columbus, Ohio
Miami University alumni
American film actresses
20th-century American actresses
21st-century American actresses
People from Waverly, Virginia